Dysdera alentejana is a spider species found in Portugal.

See also 
 List of Dysderidae species

References 

Dysderidae
Spiders of Europe
Spiders described in 1996